My Love is the second studio album of Taiwanese Mandopop artist Hebe Tien, of girl group S.H.E. It was released on September 2, 2011 by HIM International Music and contains ten tracks. The pre-order opened on August 17, 2011 and came with a bag. The album received seven nominations at the 23rd Golden Melody Awards.

Background and development 
After a year of releasing her debut album To Hebe, Tien continued with the keyword "love", the title of her song from the previous album. Following the release of her debut album and her S.H.E group mate Selina's accident while filming a drama in Shanghai, Tien experienced ups and downs. According to her, people think about a lot of issues in life and feel lonely so they need love and support. Tien named her album My Love to express her love for music and to convey her love and sing to the people about the things she love.

The song "妳" written by Sodagreen lead vocalist Wu Qing-feng was the first song recorded for the album and is dedicated by Tien to her group mate Selina and sent to her when recording finished. Tien recalled that when she first recorded the song, she was too emotional that she cried her eyes out and couldn't sing, so she had to calm herself and record again the next day. The song was written during Selina's accident so she had mixed feelings but couldn't express them. Before writing the song, Qing-feng looked up the S.H.E members on Weibo and was moved by the deep friendship of the three.

Track listing

Music videos

Awards and nominations

References

2011 albums
Hebe Tien albums
HIM International Music albums